North Branch Slippery Rock Creek is a main tributary of Slippery Rock Creek in western Pennsylvania.  The stream rises in southeastern Venango County and flows south-southwest entering Slippery Rock Creek near Atwells Crossing. The watershed is roughly 33% agricultural, 59% forested and the rest is other uses.

See also 
 List of rivers of Pennsylvania

References

Rivers of Pennsylvania
Tributaries of the Beaver River
Rivers of Butler County, Pennsylvania
Rivers of Venango County, Pennsylvania